Jay Bridge is a wooden covered bridge that spans the east branch of the Ausable River in Jay, Essex County, New York, USA. It is eligible to be listed in the National Register of Historic Places. Of the 29 covered bridges in New York State, it and the Copeland Bridge in the town of Edinburg, Saratoga County are the only two situated in the Adirondacks.

History
The first bridge in this location was destroyed by flooding in 1856. The bridge was rebuilt in 1857 using a Howe truss design.

In 1997, traffic was rerouted to a new steel bridge just downstream. The original has since been restored for pedestrians and bicycles.

See also
List of bridges documented by the Historic American Engineering Record in New York (state)

External links
The Rebirth of a Covered Bridge (Jay Bridge)
Jay Bridge, at New York State Covered Bridge Society
Jay Bridge, at Covered Bridges of the Northeast USA

Covered bridges in New York (state)
Bridges completed in 1857
Wooden bridges in New York (state)
Bridges in Essex County, New York
Historic American Engineering Record in New York (state)
Tourist attractions in Essex County, New York
Road bridges in New York (state)
Howe truss bridges in the United States
1857 establishments in New York (state)